My Suicide Story is an American documentary series created and directed by Joe Massa. The series features survivors of attempted suicide who share their stories of survival and triumph over their suicide attempts. It premiered on July 22, 2018, on YouTube.

References

External links 

English-language television shows
American non-fiction web series
2018 American television series debuts